Dana Procházková (born 1951) is an orienteering competitor who competed for Czechoslovakia. At the 1974 World Orienteering Championships in Viborg she won a bronze medal in the relay, together with Anna Handzlová and Renata Vlachová.

References

1951 births
Living people
Czechoslovak orienteers
Female orienteers
Foot orienteers
World Orienteering Championships medalists